Bucculatrix centroptila is a moth in the family Bucculatricidae that was first described in 1934 by Edward Meyrick. It is found in India.

The larvae feed on Firmiana colorata.

References

Natural History Museum Lepidoptera generic names catalog

Bucculatricidae
Moths described in 1934
Taxa named by Edward Meyrick
Moths of Asia